The Toronto Aeros, often called Beatrice Aeros after their primary sponsor, the North York Aeros, and the Mississauga Aeros were a semi-professional women's ice hockey team that played in Toronto and Mississauga, Ontario. The team played its home games in Beatrice Ice Gardens in Toronto and Iceland Mississauga in Mississauga. In 2010, the Canadian Women's Hockey League placed an expansion team back in Toronto and was sometimes known as the Aeros among fans. In 2011, the CWHL team eventually took on the name of Toronto Furies.

Team history
Originally playing out of North York, Ontario, the senior Aeros were established in the Central Ontario Women's Hockey League and the Ontario Women's Hockey Association as the Aeros. The senior team was associated with an organization that operated several teams from youth to adult. Throughout the organization's history, the senior Aeros have also been known as the Toronto Aeros and North York Aeros. In 1999, the organization began being called the Beatrice Aeros after their main sponsor, Beatrice Foods Canada, and played out of the Beatrice Ice Gardens at York University.

The senior Aeros joined the National Women's Hockey League (NWHL) upon its launch in 1998. On March 22, 1998, Dana Antal scored at 5:31 of a 10-minute overtime period on a pass from Jennifer Botterill as Team Alberta (represented by the Calgary Oval X-Treme) defeated Team Ontario (represented by the Beatrice Aeros) by a 3–2 mark to win the Esso Women's Nationals.

During the 1999–2000 NWHL season, the Beatrice Aeros played the Sainte-Julie Pantheres in the championship game. In the second game of the final, Cherie Piper scored the game-winning goal with 9:06 left to play in the first period, and Lauren Goldstein earned the shutout for the Aeros. With the 1–0 win, Beatrice earned the championship based on goal differential.

The team changed its name in 2003 to become the Toronto Aeros.  In 2006–07 they relocated to Mississauga and changed their name to the Mississauga Aeros.  They played their home games at the Beatrice Ice Gardens at York University in Toronto. 

After one season in Mississauga, the NWHL and the senior Aeros ceased operations in 2007. The Canadian Women's Hockey League subsequently was created from the remnants of the NWHL. As part of the new league's reorganization, the NWHL's Oakville Ice returned to affiliating with the Mississauga Chiefs hockey organization and took the Mississauga Aeros place in the new league for 2007–08. The Mississauga Chiefs played for three seasons before the CWHL restructured completely, folding the Chiefs team while subsequently placing a new team in Toronto, which then acquired many of the former Chiefs' players including Jennifer Botterill and Sami Jo Small. While officially the 2010–11 Toronto CWHL team had no name, but would sometimes be called the "Toronto Aeros" in the media. The CWHL team adopted the name Toronto Furies after their appearance 2011 Clarkson Cup.

Championship

List of NWHL Championship Cup won 1998 to 2007
 1998–99 - Fran Rider Cup (second place at Esso Women's nationals)
 1999–2000 - Beatrice Aeros vs. Sainte-Julie Panthères, hosted in Brampton
 2000–01 - Beatrice Aeros vs. Sainte-Julie Panthères
 2001–02 - Beatrice Aeros vs. Brampton Thunder
 2004–05 - Toronto Aeros vs. Montreal Axion, hosted in Brampton

Season-by-season

Notable former players

References

Aeros
Ice hockey clubs established in 2003
Ice hockey clubs disestablished in 2007
Women's ice hockey teams in Canada
Canadian Women's Hockey League teams
Defunct ice hockey teams in Canada
2003 establishments in Ontario
2007 disestablishments in Ontario
Women in Ontario
Sport in Mississauga